Carlos Basilio Ezeta y León (14 June 1852 – 21 March 1903) was President of El Salvador from 22 June 1890 to 9 June 1894, when he was overthrown in the Revolution of the 44. He was a military ruler. He died on 21 March 1903, aged 50.

Early life 

Carlos Ezeta was born in San Salvador, El Salvador, on 14 June 1852. His father was General Eligió Ezeta and his mother was Asunción de León Corleto, and he had a younger brother, Antonio Ezeta. He married Josefa Marroquín and had four children: Carlota, Matilde, Emilia, and Asunción.

Military service 

Ezeta served in the Salvadoran Army during Santiago González Portillo's and Fernando Figueroa's invasions of Honduras in 1872 and 1873. During his service, he was injured in battle in Santa Bárbara. He lived in Costa Rica in 1875, returned to El Salvador in 1876, and later visited the United States and Guatemala. He returned to El Salvador in 1885 to fight against Guatemala in Barrios' War of Reunification and fought in the Battle of Chalchuapa.

Presidency 

On 22 June 1890, Ezeta travelled to the White House of the incumbent President, General Francisco Menéndez, and started an uprising that overthrew Menéndez during which he died. On 1 March 1891, Ezeta formally took office as the President of El Salvador after winning the 1891 Salvadoran presidential election.

Ezeta oversaw El Salvador's relative political stability at a time when the neighboring republics of Honduras and Guatemala were at war, but he soon lost favor with the landowners and was overthrown in the Revolution of the 44 on 9 June 1894 by Rafael Antonio Gutiérrez with assistance from Nicaragua, Guatemala and Honduras.

Later life and death 

He fled to Panama, and then travelled to Europe as there was a warrant for his death; he then returned to Central America and then settled in Mazatlán, Mexico, where he died on 21 March 1903, aged 50. His remains are buried at Angela Peralta Cemetery in Mazatlán.

References 

Presidents of El Salvador
1852 births
1903 deaths
People from San Salvador
19th-century Salvadoran people
Leaders who took power by coup
Leaders ousted by a coup
Salvadoran military personnel